Yarrawonga is an outer northern suburb of Palmerston. It is 21 km SE of the Darwin City and 2.1 km from Palmerston City. Its Local Government Area is the City of Palmerston.

Yarrawonga is named after the Yarrawonga Zoo which was established in the area in 1965.

It is believed that the name came from the Victorian town of Yarrawonga in the northern part of the state.

The area is one of Palmerston's Industrial Suburbs, along with Pinelands.

References

External links
 http://www.nt.gov.au/lands/lis/placenames/origins/greaterdarwin.shtml#y

Suburbs of Darwin, Northern Territory